Savar is a city in central Bangladesh, located in Dhaka District in the division of Dhaka. It is the closest city from Dhaka. It is also a part of Greater Dhaka conurbation which forms the Dhaka megacity. About 296,851 people live here which makes this city the 2nd largest in Dhaka District and 11th largest city in Bangladesh.

Geography

Demographics
The number of total household of the city is 60,290.

Administration

See also 
  located in Savar
 Rana Plaza

References

Cities in Bangladesh
Populated places in Dhaka Division